George Simpson Carruthers (1 February 1879 – 29 June 1949) was an Australian politician. Born in Lancaster, England, he was elected to the Tasmanian House of Assembly in 1934 as an Independent member for Denison. He held the seat until 1937, when he was defeated. Carruthers died in 1949 at Hobart.

References

1879 births
1949 deaths
Independent members of the Parliament of Tasmania
Members of the Tasmanian House of Assembly
People from Lancaster, Lancashire
English emigrants to Australia